Labasa F.C. is a Fijian football club based in Labasa that competes in the premier division of the Fiji Premier League.

History
A local football competition was held in Labasa from 1938. The competition included some ethnic Fijian Clubs. Labasa did not join the National Association when it was formed, in 1938, due to the distance of Labasa from the main island of Viti Levu, where all, except one, club was based.

In 1942, under the Presidency of Harold B. Gibson, a former member of the Legislative Council, Labasa Soccer Association joined the national football body, then known as the Fiji Indian Football Association.

Labasa remained at the periphery of football in Fiji, struggling to compete with teams from Viti Levu, until 1969, when it hosted the Inter-District Championship (IDC) for the first time. The team was runner-up in the IDC of 1972, 1973 and 1978. Labasa F.C. won the IDC for the first time in 1992 and again two years later in 1994.

In October 2011, the team won its third IDC tournament defeating Ba F.C. 1–0 at the TFL National Stadium in Suva. Labasa's winning goal in the final was scored by striker, Maciu Dunadamu in the second half of the match.

Achievements
League Championship (for Districts): 2
Winner: 1991, 2007.

 Inter-District Championship : 6
Winner: 1992, 1994, 2011, 2016, 2019, 2020.
Runner-up: 1972, 1973, 1978.

Battle of the Giants: 2
Winner: 1997, 2019.
Runner-up: 1986, 1993, 2000, 2002, 2008, 2012.

Fiji Football Association Cup Tournament: 4
Winner: 1992, 1997 (shared with Ba), 1999, 2015.
Runner-up: 1991, 1995, 2001, 2006, 2007, 2008, 2011, 2018.

Champion versus Champion: 5
Winner: 1992, 2007, 2017, 2019, 2020.
Runner-up: 1994.

Girmit Cup: 1
Winner: 1979.
Runner-up:

Current squad
Squad for the 2019 Inter-District Championship

Youth squad

Personnel

Current technical staff

See also
 Fiji Football Association

References

Football clubs in Fiji
1942 establishments in Fiji